The 2012–13 Azerbaijan First Division  is the second-level of football in Azerbaijan. There were thirteen teams participating in Azerbaijani First Division this season.

Teams
In April 2013, Tərəqqi owners announced that club will be dissolved and all of their results in Azerbaijan First Division will be annulled.

League table

Results

Season statistics

Top scorers

Hat-tricks

 4 Player scored 4 goals

References

External links
 pfl.az
 AFFA 

Azerbaijan First Division seasons
2012–13 in Azerbaijani football
Azer